Schlawiner is an Austrian television series, which since 2010 is produced by Breitwandfilm, along with ORF and Bayerischer Rundfunk. It is a mix of comedy and mockumentary. Directed by Paul Harather, who became known for his films Cappuccino Melange and Indien in the 1990s. The first season was shot between June 2009 and November 2010. The next season was made in the summer of 2012. Participating actors and actresses include Marlene Morreis.

See also
List of Austrian television series

References

External links
 

2000s Austrian television series
2010s Austrian television series
2009 Austrian television series debuts
2013 Austrian television series endings
German-language television shows
ORF (broadcaster) original programming